WVSL (1240 AM, "ESPN Radio Selinsgrove") was a sports talk formatted radio station licensed to serve Selinsgrove, Pennsylvania. The station was owned by Max Media and was operated out of the Max Media of Pennsylvania studios in Selinsgrove. The station operated in simulcast with sister station WVSL-FM. Established in 1967, WVSL surrendered its license to the Federal Communications Commission (FCC) on February 1, 2013; the license was canceled a week later.

Studios
WVSL's main studio was located at 450 Route 204 Highway in Selinsgrove. WVSL, along with its sister stations, operated a public studio located inside the Susquehanna Valley Mall located in Hummels Wharf.

Programming
Notable weekday programming included SportsCenter All Night, Mike and Mike in the Morning, The Herd with Collin Cowherd, The Scott Van Pelt Show, The Doug Gottleib Show, and ESPN Radio Tonight''.

WVSL was an affiliate of the Pittsburgh Steelers Radio Network and broadcasts Pittsburgh Steelers football, both at home and on the road, every Sunday/Monday during the NFL season in place of regularly scheduled programming. The station is an affiliate of the Philadelphia Phillies Radio Network and broadcasts Philadelphia Phillies Baseball, both at home and on the road during the MLB season in place of regularly scheduled programming.

WVSL broadcast PHAC events throughout the year. These broadcasts aired in place of regularly scheduled programming.

References

VSL
Snyder County, Pennsylvania
Radio stations established in 1967
Radio stations disestablished in 2013
Defunct radio stations in the United States
1967 establishments in Pennsylvania
2013 disestablishments in Pennsylvania
VSL
ESPN Radio stations